Gandabeh (also Romanized as Gandābeh; also known as Sādāt-e Gandābeh) is a village in Dowreh Rural District, Chegeni District, Dowreh County, Lorestan Province, Iran. At the 2006 census, its population was 581, in 122 families.

References 

Towns and villages in Dowreh County